Transylvania Regional Hospital (TRH), formerly known as Transylvania Community Hospital, is a Joint Commission on Accreditation of Healthcare Organizations accredited 94-bed community hospital. It was formed in 1933 and is located between downtown Brevard and the entrance to Pisgah National Forest in Transylvania County, North Carolina.  Hospital facilities include a fully stocked blood bank. It is operated by Mission Health System.

References

External links
 

Hospitals in North Carolina
Buildings and structures in Transylvania County, North Carolina
Hospitals established in 1933